SL Corporation (hangul:에스엘코포레이션) is a multinational automotive components manufacturing company headquartered in Gyeongsan, South Korea. It has manufacturing plants in Asia-Pacific, India, Europe, and the United States.
Annual turn-over is around 1.8billion USD
as group basis.

History
SL Corporation's origins date back to 1954 and the establishment of Samlip Motor Works as a manufacturer of bicycle parts. In 1968 the company was incorporated into Samlip Industrial Co. Ltd. (hangul:삼립산업) and in 1969 it began manufacturing head lamps for Hyundai Motors. The name was finally changed to SL Corporation in 2004 under the leadership of Lee Choong Kon, CEO. Currently SL Corporation manufactures various products for the automotive industry. SL Corporation received the GM Supplier of the Year award for sixteen straight years (1997–2012) as well as the Five Star quality certificate from Hyundai-Kia Motors.

Operations

Products
 Exterior Lighting Systems
 Suspension System Components
 Chassis & Steering System Components
 Door System Components
 Power Train System Components
 Front End Modules
 Mirror

Customers
 General Motors
 Hyundai
 Kia Motors
 SsangYong Motor Company
 GM Daewoo
 Chrysler
 Subaru
 Honda
 Ford India

Major competitors
 REBO
 Valeo
 Hyundai Mobis
 Sungwoo Automotive
 Mopar
 AC Delco
 Hella

See also
 Economy of South Korea
 Auto parts
 SL Lumax Limited

References

External links
 SL Corporation Homepage

Auto parts suppliers of South Korea
Multinational companies headquartered in South Korea
Vehicle manufacturing companies established in 1954
South Korean brands
South Korean companies established in 1954